The Jersey City, Hoboken and Rutherford Electric Railway was incorporated in 1893, and leased from 1894-1899 to the New Jersey Electric Railway Company. The line was operated by Jersey City, Hoboken and Paterson Street Railway. The track length was 18.57 miles.

The rail line in Hoboken, New Jersey, was controversial at the time. Officials were concerned that an electric railway would endanger the public and frighten horses.

See also
 Paterson Plank Road
 List of New Jersey street railroads
 Paterson, Passaic and Rutherford Electric Railway

References

New Jersey streetcar lines
Defunct New Jersey railroads
Railway companies established in 1893
Defunct public transport operators in the United States
Tram, urban railway and trolley companies
Rutherford, New Jersey
1893 establishments in New Jersey